The New World vulture or condor family, Cathartidae, contains seven extant species in five genera. It includes five extant vultures and two extant condors found in warm and temperate areas of the Americas. The "New World" vultures were widespread in both the Old World and North America during the Neogene.

Old World vultures and New World vultures do not form a single clade, but the two groups are similar in appearance due to convergent evolution.

Vultures are scavenging birds, feeding mostly from carcasses of dead animals without apparent ill effects. Bacteria in the food source, pathogenic to other vertebrates, dominate the vulture's gut flora, and vultures benefit from the bacterial breakdown of carrion tissue. Some species of New World vulture have a good sense of smell, whereas Old World vultures find carcasses exclusively by sight. A particular characteristic of many vultures is a bald head, devoid of feathers.

Taxonomy and systematics

The family Cathartidae was introduced (as the subfamily Cathartinae) by the French ornithologist Frédéric de Lafresnaye in 1839. The New World vultures comprise seven species in five genera. The genera are Coragyps, Cathartes, Gymnogyps, Sarcoramphus, and Vultur. Of these, only Cathartes is not monotypic. The family's scientific name, Cathartidae, comes from cathartes, Greek for "purifier". Although New World vultures have many resemblances to Old World vultures they are not very closely related.  Rather, they resemble Old World vultures because of convergent evolution.  Phylogenetic analyses including all Cathartidae species found two primary clades: (1) black vulture (Coragyps atratus) together with the three Cathartes species (lesser C. burrovianus and greater C. melambrotus yellow-headed vultures, and turkey vulture C. aura), and (2) king vulture (Sarcoramphus papa), California (Gymnogyps californianus) and Andean (Vultur gryphus) condors.

New World vultures were traditionally placed in a family of their own in the Falconiformes.  However, in the late 20th century some ornithologists argued that they are more closely related to storks on the basis of karyotype, morphological, and behavioral data. Thus some authorities placed them in the Ciconiiformes with storks and herons; Sibley and Monroe (1990) even considered them a subfamily of the storks. This was criticized, and an early DNA sequence study was based on erroneous data and subsequently retracted. There was then an attempt to raise the New World vultures to the rank of an independent order, Cathartiformes, not closely associated with either the birds of prey or the storks and herons.

However, recent multi-locus DNA studies on the evolutionary relationships between bird groups indicate that New World vultures are related to the other birds of prey, excluding the Falconidae which are distantly related to other raptors, and are not close to storks.  In this analysis, the New World vultures should be part of a new order Accipitriformes instead, or perhaps as part of an order (Cathartiformes) closely related to, but distinct from, other birds of prey (besides falcons). New World vultures are a sister group to Accipitriformes when the latter is viewed as a group consisting of Accipitridae, the osprey and secretarybird. Both groups are basal members of the recently recognized clade Afroaves.

Extinct species and fossils
The fossil history of the Cathartidae is complex, and many taxa that may possibly have been New World vultures have at some stage been treated as early representatives of the family. There is no unequivocal European record from the Neogene.

It is clear that the Cathartidae had a much higher diversity in the Plio-Pleistocene, rivalling the current diversity of Old World vultures and their relatives in shapes, sizes, and ecological niches. Extinct taxa include:

 Diatropornis ("European vulture") Late Eocene/Early Oligocene – ?Middle Oligocene of France
 Phasmagyps Chadronian of Colorado
 Cathartidae gen. et sp. indet. Late Oligocene of Mongolia
 Brasilogyps Late Oligocene/Early Miocene of Brazil
 Hadrogyps ("American dwarf vulture") Middle Miocene of SW North America
 Cathartidae gen. et sp. indet. Late Miocene/Early Pliocene of Lee Creek Mine, USA
 Pliogyps ("Miocene vulture") Late Miocene – Late Pliocene of S North America
 Perugyps ("Peruvian vulture") Pisco Late Miocene/Early Pliocene of SC Peru
 Dryornis ("Argentinean vulture") Early – Late? Pliocene of Argentina; may belong to modern genus Vultur
 Cathartidae gen. et sp. indet. Middle Pliocene of Argentina
 Aizenogyps ("South American vulture") Late Pliocene of SE North America
 Breagyps  ("long-legged vulture") Late Pleistocene of SW North America
 Geronogyps Late Pleistocene of Argentina and Peru
 Gymnogyps varonai Late Quaternary of Cuba
 Wingegyps Late Pleistocene of Brazil
 Pleistovultur Late Pleistocene/Early Holocene of Brazil
 Cathartidae gen. et sp. indet. Cuba
Gymnogyps amplus  Late Pleistocene – Holocene of W North America

Description

New World vultures are generally large, ranging in length from the lesser yellow-headed vulture at 56–61 centimeters (22–24 inches) up to the California and Andean condors, both of which can reach 120 centimeters (48 inches) in length and weigh 12 or more kilograms (26 or more pounds). Plumage is predominantly black or brown, and is sometimes marked with white. All species have featherless heads and necks. In some, this skin is brightly colored, and in the king vulture it is developed into colorful wattles and outgrowths.

All New World vultures have long, broad wings and a stiff tail, suitable for soaring. They are the best adapted to soaring of all land birds. The feet are clawed but weak and not adapted to grasping. The front toes are long with small webs at their bases. No New World vulture possesses a syrinx, the vocal organ of birds. Therefore, the voice is limited to infrequent grunts and hisses.

The beak is slightly hooked and is relatively weak compared with those of other birds of prey. This is because it is adapted to tear the weak flesh of partially rotted carrion, rather than fresh meat. The nostrils are oval and are set in a soft cere. The nasal passage is perforate, not divided by a septum, so that when looking from the side, one can see through the beak. The eyes are prominent, and, unlike those of eagles, hawks, and falcons, they are not shaded by a brow bone. Members of Coragyps and Cathartes have a single incomplete row of eyelashes on the upper lid and two rows on the lower lid, while Gymnogyps, Vultur, and Sarcoramphus lack eyelashes altogether.

New World vultures have the unusual habit of urohidrosis, or defecating on their legs to cool them evaporatively. As this behavior is also present in storks, it is one of the arguments for a close relationship between the two groups.

Distribution and habitat 

New World vultures are restricted to the western hemisphere. They can be found from southern Canada to South America. Most species are mainly resident, but the turkey vulture populations breeding in Canada and the northern US migrate south in the northern winter. New World vultures inhabit a large variety of habitats and ecosystems, ranging from deserts to tropical rainforests and at heights of sea level to mountain ranges, using their highly adapted sense of smell to locate carrion. These species of birds are also occasionally seen in human settlements, perhaps emerging to feed upon the food sources provided from roadkills.

Behavior and ecology

Breeding 
New World vultures and condors do not build nests, but lay eggs on bare surfaces. On average one to three eggs are laid, depending on the species.  Chicks are naked on hatching and later grow down.  Like most birds the parents feed the young by regurgitation. The young are altricial, fledging in 2 to 3 months. California Condor chicks fledge anywhere from 5-6 months, while Andean condor chicks fledge anywhere from 6-10 months.

Feeding 

All living species of New World vultures and condors are scavengers.  Their diet consists, primarily, of carrion, and they are commonly seen in carcasses.  Other additions to the diet include fruit (especially rotten fruit) and garbage. An unusual characteristic of the species in genus Cathartes is a highly developed sense of smell, which they use to find carrion. They locate carrion by detecting the scent of ethyl mercaptan, a gas produced by the bodies of decaying animals. The olfactory lobe of the brains in these species, which is responsible for processing smells, is particularly large compared to that of other animals. Other species, such as the American black vulture and the king vulture, have weak senses of smell and find food only by sight, sometimes by following Cathartes vultures and other scavengers.

Tolerance to bacterial toxins in decaying meat
Vultures possess a very acidic digestive system and their gut is dominated by two species of anaerobic bacteria that help them withstand toxins they ingest when feeding on decaying prey. In a 2014 study of 50 (turkey and black) vultures, researchers analyzed the microbial community or microbiome of the facial skin and the large intestine. The facial bacterial flora and the gut flora overlapped somewhat, but in general, the facial flora was much more diverse than the gut flora, which is in contrast to other vertebrates, where the gut flora is more diverse. Two anaerobic faecal bacteria groups that are pathogenic in other vertebrates stood out: Clostridia and Fusobacteriota (formerly Fusobacteria). They were especially common in the gut with Clostridia DNA sequence counts between 26% and 85% relative to total sequence counts, and Fusobacteriota between 0.2% and 54% in black vultures and 2% to 69% of all counts in turkey vultures. Unexpectedly, both anaerobic bacteria were also found on the air exposed facial skin samples, Clostridia at 7%–40% and Fusobacteriota up to 23%. It is assumed that vultures acquire them when they insert their heads into the body cavities of rotten meat. The regularly ingested Clostridia and Fusobacteriota outcompete other bacterial groups in the gut and become predominant. Genes that encode tissue-degrading enzymes and toxins that are associated with Clostridium perfringens have been found in the vulture gut metagenome. This supports the hypothesis that vultures do benefit from the bacterial breakdown of carrion, while at the same time tolerating the bacterial toxins.

Status and conservation
The California condor is critically endangered. It formerly ranged from Baja California to British Columbia, but by 1937 was restricted to California. In 1987, all surviving birds were removed from the wild into a captive breeding program to ensure the species' survival. In 2005, there were 127 Californian condors in the wild. As of October 31, 2009 there were 180 birds in the wild. The Andean condor is vulnerable.
The American black vulture, turkey vulture, lesser yellow-headed vulture, and greater yellow-headed vulture are listed as species of Least Concern by the IUCN Red List. This means that populations appear to remain stable, and they have not reached the threshold of inclusion as a threatened species, which requires a decline of more than 30 percent in ten years or three generations. The king vulture is also listed as Least Concern, although there is evidence of a decline in the population.

In culture
The American black vulture and the king vulture appear in a variety of Maya hieroglyphs in Mayan codices. The king vulture is one of the most common species of birds represented. Its glyph is easily distinguishable by the knob on the bird's beak and by the concentric circles that represent the bird's eyes. It is sometimes portrayed as a god with a human body and a bird head. According to Mayan mythology, this god often carried messages between humans and the other gods. It is also used to represent Cozcaquauhtli, the thirteenth day of the month in the Mayan calendar. In Mayan codices, the American black vulture is normally connected with death or shown as a bird of prey, and its glyph is often depicted attacking humans. This species lacks the religious connections that the king vulture has. While some of the glyphs clearly show the American black vulture's open nostril and hooked beak, some are assumed to be this species because they are vulture-like and painted black, but lack the king vulture's knob.

See also
Old World vultures
Teratornithidae
Thunderbird (cryptozoology)

Notes

References

 Allaby, Michael (1992).  The Concise Oxford Dictionary of Zoology.  Oxford: Oxford University Press , p. 348
 Alvarenga, H. M F. & S. L. Olson. (2004). "A new genus of tiny condor from the Pleistocene of Brazil (Aves: Vulturidae)." Proceedings of the Biological Society of Washington 117(1)  1 9
 Alvarenga, H.; Brito, G. R. R.; Migotto, R.; Hubbe, A.; Höfling, E. (2008) Pleistovultur nevesi gen. et sp. nov. (Aves: Vulturidae) and the diversity of condors and vultures in the South American Pleistocene. Ameghiniana 45 (3): 613–618.
 American Ornithologists' Union (2009) Check-list of North American Birds, Tinamiformes to Falconiformes 7th Edition. AOU. Retrieved 6 October 2009
 American Ornithologists' Union (2010) Check-list of North American Birds, Tinamiformes to Falconiformes 7th Edition. AOU. Retrieved 3 August 2010
  Erratum, PNAS 92(7); 3076 (1995).      
 BirdLife International (2004). 2001 Categories & Criteria (version 3.1). International Union for Conservation of Nature and Natural Resources. Retrieved 9 September 2007.
 
 
  p. 238
 Brown J. W. & D. P. Mindell (2009) "Diurnal birds of prey (Falconiformes)"  pp. 436–439 in Hedges S. B. and S. Kumar, Eds. (2009) The Timetree of Life Oxford University Press. 
 
 
 Cracraft, J., F. K. Barker, M. Braun, J. Harshman, G. J. Dyke, J. Feinstein, S. Stanley, A. Cibois, P. Schikler, P. Beresford, J. García-Moreno, M. D. Sorenson, T. Yuri, and D. P. Mindell. (2004) "Phylogenetic relationships among modern birds (Neornithes): toward an avian tree of life." pp. 468–489 in Assembling the tree of life (J. Cracraft and M. J. Donoghue, eds.). Oxford University Press, New York.
 
 
 Farmer A, Francl, K (2008) Cathartes aura  University of Michigan Animal Diversity Web. Retrieved 8 October 2009
 Feduccia, J. Alan. (1999) The Origin and Evolution of Birds Yale University Press  p. 300
 
 
  p. 72
 
 Howell, Steve N.G., and Sophie Webb (1995). A Guide to the Birds of Mexico and Northern Central America. New York: Oxford University Press , p. 174
 
 Kemp, Alan, and Ian Newton (2003): New World Vultures.  In Christopher Perrins, ed., The Firefly Encyclopedia of Birds.  Firefly Books. . p. 146
 Krabbe, Niels & Fjeldså, Jon. 1990: Birds of the High Andes. Apollo Press  p. 88
 
 
 Myers, P., R. Espinosa, C. S. Parr, T. Jones, G. S. Hammond, and T. A. Dewey. (2008) Family Cathartidae University of Michigan Animal Diversity Web Retrieved 5 October 2009
 Phillips, Steven J, Comus, Patricia Wentworth (Arizona-Sonora Desert Museum) (2000) A natural history of the Sonoran Desert University of California Press  p,377
 Reed, Chester Albert (1914): The bird book: illustrating in natural colors more than seven hundred North American birds, also several hundred photographs of their nests and eggs. University of Wisconsin. p. 198
 Remsen, J. V., Jr., C. D. Cadena, A. Jaramillo, M. Nores, J. F. Pacheco, M. B. Robbins, T. S. Schulenberg, F. G. Stiles, D. F. Stotz, and K. J. Zimmer.  A classification of the bird species of South America. American Ornithologists' Union.
 Ryser Fred A. & A. Ryser, Fred Jr. 1985: Birds of the Great Basin: A Natural History. University of Nevada Press.  p. 211
Sibley, Charles G. and Burt L. Monroe  (1990)  Distribution and Taxonomy of the Birds of the World.  Yale University Press.  
 Sibley, Charles G., and Jon E. Ahlquist (1991)  Phylogeny and Classification of Birds: A Study in Molecular Evolution.  Yale University Press.  
 Snyder, Noel F. R. & Snyder, Helen (2006). Raptors of North America: Natural History and Conservation. Voyageur Press.  p. 40
 Stone, Lynn M. (1992) Vultures Rourke Publishing Group  p. 14
 
 
 Suarez, William (2004) "The identity of the fossil raptor of the genus Amplibuteo (Aves: Accipitridae) from the Quaternary of Cuba" Caribbean Journal of Science 40: (1) 120 125
 Terres, J. K. & National Audubon Society (1991). The Audubon Society Encyclopedia of North American Birds. Reprint of 1980 edition.  p 957
 Tozzer, Alfred Marston & Allen, Glover Morrill (1910). Animal Figures in the Maya Codices. Harvard University Plates 17 & 18
 
 Zim, Herbert Spencer; Robbins, Chandler S.; Bruun, Bertel (2001) Birds of North America: A Guide to Field Identification Golden Publishing.

External links
New World Vulture videos, photos and sounds on the Internet Bird Collection
New World Vulture photos on beautyofbirds.com

 
.
.
 
Extant Eocene first appearances
Eocene birds
Eocene birds of North America
Eocene birds of South America
Taxa named by Frédéric de Lafresnaye